Georgeville	 is a village in the	Cayo District	of	central interior	Belize.	The village is in an agricultural region with the most frequent crops being citrus and banana.	It is one of 192 municipalities administrated at the village level in the country for census taking purposes.	The village had a population of	922	in 2010. This represents roughly	1.4	% of the district's total population.	This was a	60.9%	increase	from	573	people recorded in the 2000 census.

References 

Populated places in Cayo District